Ethopia is a genus of snout moths. It was described by Francis Walker in 1865.

Species
 Ethopia gigantea Owada, 1986
 Ethopia roseilinea Walker, 1865

References

Tirathabini
Pyralidae genera